Joaquim Alemao (born 8 November 1957) is the former Urban development minister and a two-term Member of the Goa Legislative Assembly.

Personal life
Alemao is from a political family; his brother Churchill Alemao is a former Member of Parliament of the 14th Lok Sabha of India. He represented the Cuncolim constituency in the Legislative Assembly of Goa.

Football club
Alemao and his family own a football team called Churchill Brothers.

References 

1957 births
Living people
Indian National Congress politicians from Goa
People from South Goa district
Members of the Goa Legislative Assembly